The Juno Award for "Video of the Year" has been awarded since 1984, as recognition each year for the best music video made by a Canadian video director. The award is presented based on the Canadian nationality of the director, not necessarily the song or recording artist; there have been a number of instances where directors have been nominated or won for videos that were created for songs by American or British artists.

The award used to be called "Best Video".

Winners

Best Video (1984 - 2002)

Video of the Year (2003 - Present)

References

Video
Canadian music video awards